Bora Bora is an island group in the Leeward Islands.

Bora Bora may also refer to:

Places
Bora Bora Island, an island in the Bora Bora group
Bora Bora Airport, an airport on the island
Bora-Bora (commune), an administrative subdivision of the Leeward Islands
Kingdom of Bora Bora, a 19th-century independent state

Arts and entertainment
Bora Bora (1968 film), an Italian film
Bora Bora (2011 film), a Danish film
Bora Bora (album), by Os Paralamas do Sucesso, 1988
"Bora Bora", a 1997 song by Da Hool
"Bora Bora", a 2019 song by Lil Durk from Love Songs 4 the Streets 2
Bora Bora, a novel by Alberto Vázquez-Figueroa

See also
"Bora! Bora! Bora!", a 2017 song by Scooter
"Bora Bora Bora" (Orange Is the New Black), a 2013 television episode